A Coven of Vampires is a collection of horror short stories by English writer Brian Lumley.  The stories all concern vampires.  It was released in 1998  by Fedogan & Bremer in an edition of 1,100 copies, of which 100 were numbered and signed by the author, and illustrator.  Most of the stories originally appeared in a number of different anthologies and collections or in the magazines Terror Australis, Fantasy Tales, Weirdbook, Fear!, Fantasy and Science Fiction and Kadath.

Contents
 Foreword
 "What Dark God?"
 "Back Row"
 "The Strange Years"
 "Kiss of the Lamia"
 "Recognition"
 "The Thief Immortal"
 "Necros"
 "The Thing from the Blasted Heath"
 "Uzzi"
 "Haggopian"
 "The Picnickers"
 "Zack Phalanx Is Vlad the Impaler"
 "The House of the Temple"

Sources

1998 short story collections
Horror short story collections
Short stories by Brian Lumley
Vampires in written fiction
Fedogan & Bremer books